The DKW F10 was a car sold by DKW of Ingolstadt, West Germany, during the early part of 1950 only. It was the first postwar car produced by the firm, though it utilized the F8 chassis design of 1939–1942, albeit slightly modified. The Baur coachbuilding firm of Stuttgart supplied the bodies, which were more modern than those normally seen on 1939-1942 F8 models.

A total of 22 F10 chassis were produced at the very end of 1949, with 174 being completed during the first half of 1950. The chassis were delivered to Baur starting in January 1950, and all cars were completed and sold that year. Serial numbers ranged from F 10 10002 to F 10 10197, which means a total of 196 cars were built. When production of the F89 began in Ingolstadt, in mid-1950, the F10 was taken out of production. Very few F10 cars were sold in Germany; most were exported.

After the F89 was introduced at Ingolstadt, the East German IFA concern, which had begun building the former DKW F8 (now known as the IFA F8) in mid-1949, after several prototypes were built and displayed during 1947–1948, procured Baur bodies for these chassis, and the cars looked very similar to the DKW F10. About 250 of these Baur IFA F8 cars were built from the latter part of 1950 to about 1952.

The Baur coachbuilding firm had presented its new F10 body as early as 1948 on a used prewar DKW F8 chassis, and from late-1948 to 1952, 1,110 of these new bodies were mounted on actual prewar F8 chassis whose wood-framed bodies had deteriorated, thus essentially turning them into new cars, and giving them a new lease on life.

F10
Cars introduced in 1950